Mattheos 'Manthos' Falagas (born 24 January 1992 in Palamas, Karditsa) is a football forward who currently plays for Anagennisi Karditsa F.C.in the Football League 2, the third Greek national football division. He started his career as a professional with A.S.A., in 2009. On 19 August 2010, he signed a five-year contract with Football League club AEL 1964 FC. On 31 January 2012 he returned to his hometown team, as a free transfer.

References

1992 births
Living people
Greek footballers
Association football forwards
Athlitiki Enosi Larissa F.C. players
Super League Greece players
People from Karditsa (regional unit)
Footballers from Thessaly